Sahneh-ye Sofla (also Romanized as Şaḩneh-ye Soflá; also known as Şaḩneh-ye Pā’īn) is a village in Gorganbuy Rural District, in the Central District of Aqqala County, Golestan Province, Iran. At the 2006 census, its population was 2,958, in 610 families.

References 

Populated places in Aqqala County